Celestial Respect is the eleven studio album by Azalia Snail, released on June 28, 2011 by Silber Records.

Track listing

Personnel 
Adapted from Celestial Respect liner notes.
 Azalia Snail – vocals, instruments, production

Release history

References

External links 
 Celestial Respect at Discogs (list of releases)

2011 albums
Azalia Snail albums